Rocca San Casciano ( or ) is a comune (municipality) in the Province of Forlì-Cesena in the Italian region Emilia-Romagna, located about  southeast of Bologna and about  southwest of Forlì.

Geography
Rocca San Casciano borders the following municipalities: Dovadola, Galeata, Modigliana, Portico e San Benedetto, Predappio, Premilcuore and Tredozio.

Festa del Falò 
Rocca San Casciano is popular in the area for its Festa del Falò ("Bonfires Feast"), which is believed to originate from Celtic Pagan rites. It is documented that bonfires have been lit near the Montone River ever since the 12th century; later the event became associated with St. Joseph's Day (19 March).

San Donnino in soglio is famous

History
Rocca San Casciano is created in the 1200 d.C.

References

External links

Cities and towns in Emilia-Romagna